The Hostage is a 1966 Crown International low-budget motion picture starring  Don O'Kelly, James Almanzar and Joanne Brown, with Leland Brown, John Carradine, and Harry Dean Stanton.

The film was directed by Russell S. Doughten Jr. It was adapted for the screen by Robert Laning, based on the 1959 novel The Hostage by Henry Farrell.

When it was made, Don O'Kelly was a TV actor.  His career was cut short when he died shortly after making this movie. This was one of Harry Dean Stanton's earliest films.

Plot 
The plot centers on a young boy who becomes a hostage after he is accidentally closed inside a moving van.

Cast

Production 
The film was shot in Des Moines, Iowa.

References

External links

1966 films
Films about hostage takings
Films based on American novels
1966 drama films
Films produced by Russell S. Doughten
Crown International Pictures films
Films about kidnapping
American neo-noir films
Films set in Iowa
Films shot in Iowa
1960s English-language films
1960s American films